Eupithecia somereni is a moth in the family Geometridae. It is found in Kenya and Uganda.

References

Moths described in 1935
somereni
Moths of Africa